The 2010 Tennis Napoli Cup was a professional tennis tournament played on outdoor red clay courts. It was part of the 2010 ATP Challenger Tour. It took place in Naples, Italy between 29 March and 4 April 2010.

ATP entrants

Seeds

Rankings are as of March 22, 2010.

Other entrants
The following players received wildcards into the singles main draw:
  Thomas Fabbiano
  Potito Starace
  Bernard Tomic
  Matteo Trevisan

The following players received entry from the qualifying draw:
  Jorge Aguilar
  Francesco Aldi
  Andrea Arnaboldi
  Adrián García

The following players received the lucky spots:
  Martín Alund
  Juan-Martín Aranguren

Champions

Singles

 Rui Machado def.  Federico del Bonis, 6–4, 6–4

Doubles

 Dustin Brown /  Jesse Witten def.  Rohan Bopanna /  Aisam-ul-Haq Qureshi, 7–6(4), 7–5

References
Official website
ITF search 

Tennis Napoli Cup
Tennis Napoli Cup
2010 in Italian tennis